Alexander White (October 16, 1816 – December 13, 1893) was an American lawyer from Alabama, who represented Alabama in the U.S Congress as a Whig (1851–53), and as a Republican (1873–75).

White was born in Franklin, Tennessee. He moved to Courtland, Alabama with his family. White went to the University of Tennessee. He then served in the United States Army during the Second Seminole War. He then move to Talladega, Alabama, studied law, and was admitted to the Alabama bar in 1837. He served in the United States House of Representatives from  1851 to 1853 and from 1873 to 1875. He served in the Confederate Army during the American Civil War. He served in the Alabama Constitutional Convention of 1865 and then served in the Alabama House of Representatives in 1872. He served briefly as Chief Justice of the Utah Territorial Supreme Court in 1875. In 1876 White moved to Dallas, Texas and resumed the practice of law. He died there in 1893 and is buried in Dallas' Greenwood Cemetery.

References

External links
biographic sketch at U.S. Congress website

1816 births
1893 deaths
Alabama Whigs
Republican Party members of the Alabama House of Representatives
People from Franklin, Tennessee
People from Talladega, Alabama
People from Dallas
People of Alabama in the American Civil War
American people of the Seminole Wars
Military personnel from Tennessee
University of Tennessee alumni
Alabama lawyers
Texas lawyers
Utah Territorial judges
Robert White family of Virginia and West Virginia
Whig Party members of the United States House of Representatives
Republican Party members of the United States House of Representatives from Alabama
19th-century American politicians
Chief Justices of the Utah Supreme Court